Owd Bob is a 1938 British drama film directed by Robert Stevenson. It stars Will Fyffe and John Loder. The film was released as To the Victor in the United States. It was based on the 1898 novel Owd Bob, previously filmed in 1924.

Cast
Will Fyffe as Adam McAdam
John Loder as David Moore
Margaret Lockwood as Jeannie McAdam
Graham Moffatt as Tammas
Moore Marriott as Samuel
 Elliott Mason as Mrs. Winthrop 
 Leonard Sharp as Bookmakers Assistant
A. Bromley Davenport as Mr Parker, Magistrate	
H.F. Maltby as Sergeant Walter Musgrave	
Edmond Breon as Lord Meredale	
Wally Patch as Unlucky Joe, Bookmaker	
Alf Goddard as Barry Davis, Bookmaker

Production
It was an early role for Margaret Lockwood.

Critical reception
The New York Times wrote, "it is an affectionate film, simple as a shepherd's life, and it is an admirable film, gaited to the remarkably adept performance of Will Fyffe as the likable old curmudgeon, McAdam. Mr. Fyffe's McAdam fits snugly into the mental dossier we have been compiling under the heading, "great performances." Such a treacherous old rascal, such an old reprobate, such a wicked-eyed old hypocrite, such a beloved old rip has not been seen hereabouts for many a moon. Such a terribly amusing old boy!...We found it a thoroughly delightful picture, true to its background and true to its author...In short, we enjoyed the picture for the simple and kindly offering it is, and we feel that you will, too—especially if you've a pup about the house."

References

External links

Owd Bob at Britmovie
Owd Bob at TCMDB

1938 films
Films directed by Robert Stevenson
British drama films
1938 drama films
Films based on British novels
British black-and-white films
1930s English-language films
1930s British films